The 1999–00 Algerian League Cup was the 3rd season of the Algerian League Cup. The competition was open to all 26 Algerian clubs who participated in the Algerian Ligue Professionnelle 1 and the Algerian Ligue Professionnelle 2. It is known as the Coupe du Groupement Professionnel.

Group stage
The competition takes place in two distinct phases. There is first of all a phase known as the group phase, which takes place in a maximum of 9 days, depending on the group composition. Then the qualifiers of the 3 hens compete in a phase of direct elimination after a draw and which starts at the stage of the eighths of finals. These 3 groups are simply called Groupe Ouest, Groupe Center and Groupe Est and make references to the 3 major football regions of the country. The composition of the Center Group is higher than the other two because it has more clubs in 1 and 2 division. In fact, since this competition is a cup only played by so-called professional or semi-professional teams, only the Algerian Ligue Professionnelle 1 and the Algerian Ligue Professionnelle 2.

Groupe Ouest

Groupe Centre

Groupe Est

Knockout stage
As the first phase of the pool tournament of the East and West Center groups is over, a random draw is made between the qualifiers of these groups on behalf of the eighth finals which will take place on February 10, 2000. Also note that each meeting will be held on neutral ground, the venues and stadiums for each of the matches are designated. Since this is a direct elimination phase to be played if necessary with overtime and penalty kicks, the FAF, in order to avoid any polemics of fairness and unable to allow to play the matches in going and return due to loaded schedule opts for the solution of neutral ground

Round of 16

Quarter-finals

Semi-finals

Final

Notes & references

Notes

References

External links
 Archives du site du football algérien, DZFoot
 RSSSF, the world's football database

Algerian League Cup
Algerian League Cup
Algerian League Cup